Matyshevo is a rural locality (a selo) and the administrative center of Matyshevskoye Rural Settlement, Rudnyansky District, Volgograd Oblast, Russia. The population was 1,523 as of 2010. There are 14 streets.

Geography 
Matyshevo is located 32 km west of Rudnya (the district's administrative centre) by road. Matyshevo (settlement) is the nearest rural locality.

Notable people 

 Anna Glushenkova, Russian-born Uzbekistani chemist

References 

Rural localities in Rudnyansky District, Volgograd Oblast